Alan Reeves (born 19 November 1967) is an English football coach and former footballer.

As a player, he was a centre back who notably played in the Premier League for Wimbledon. He also played in the Football League for Norwich City, 
Gillingham, Chester City, Rochdale and Swindon Town.

He has since managed the under-23 side at AFC Wimbledon, a position he held for five years from 2014, departing in May 2019 by mutual consent.

Playing career
He was known primarily as a reliable centre half for Football League clubs, although he played FA Premier League football for four seasons with Wimbledon during the 1990s. He also played for Gillingham, Chester City, Rochdale and Swindon Town, where he spent the last eight years of his playing career before hanging up his boots in 2006, also as a player/coach, before becoming assistant manager.

Reeves served as assistant manager for Brentford, from where he left with manager Scott Fitzgerald on 10 April 2007 after the club's relegation. He interviewed for the vacant Crawley Town manager role in May 2007, but was unsuccessful in receiving the job, reportedly due to differences with then chairman James Moore.

Coaching career
On 19 June 2014, it was announced than Alan would become the new AFC Wimbledon Development Squad and Academy under-23 manager. After five years, he left the club by mutual consent on 14 May 2019.

Personal life
His twin brother David was also a professional footballer, most notably with Bolton Wanderers, Carlisle United and Chesterfield.

Whilst his brother was coaching at Gainsborough Trinity. Alan stated on an interview with LBC Radio that he sent letters to prospective clubs, purporting to be from his brother, in order to secure trials with them.

Honours
Individual
 PFA Team of the Year: 1993–94 Third Division

References

External links

1967 births
Living people
Sportspeople from Birkenhead
English footballers
Association football defenders
Heswall F.C. players
Norwich City F.C. players
Gillingham F.C. players
Chester City F.C. players
Rochdale A.F.C. players
Wimbledon F.C. players
Swindon Town F.C. players
English Football League players
Premier League players
Swindon Town F.C. non-playing staff
Brentford F.C. non-playing staff
AFC Wimbledon non-playing staff
Twin sportspeople
English twins